Purple Heart Highway may refer to:

Des Moines Bypass
Guam Highway 8
Interstate 11
Interstate 20, from Interstate 285 to U.S. Route 441
Interstate 76, from Interstate 71 to Interstate 80
Interstate 180 (Nebraska)
Pennsylvania Route 5
Pennsylvania Route 45
U.S. Route 5, from East Hartford to East Windsor-Enfield
U.S. Route 171

Highway